Napoleon "Chance" Cummings (June 8, 1892 – April 22, 1974) was an American baseball first baseman and second baseman in the Negro leagues. He played from 1916 to 1928, mostly with the Atlantic City Bacharach Giants. He began his career in Jacksonville, Florida with the Duval Giants and moved with the team to Atlantic City, New Jersey to become one of the original Bacharach Giants from 1916 to 1918. He returned to the Bacharach Giants from 1923 to 1928 and was part of the team when they won Eastern Colored League pennants in 1926 and 1927. His nickname, "Chance," came from being compared to the Chicago Cubs' first baseman, Frank Chance.

References

External links
 and Baseball-Reference Black Baseball stats and Seamheads

1892 births
1974 deaths
Bacharach Giants players
Hilldale Club players
Pennsylvania Red Caps of New York players
Baseball players from Jacksonville, Florida
20th-century African-American sportspeople
Baseball infielders